Mainsforth is a small village in County Durham, England. It is to the east of Ferryhill, and lies within the ecclesiastical parish of Bishop Middleham. The earliest settlement in Mainsforth may have been on Marble (Narble Hill). It has been suggested, without great historical foundation, that this was a Danish settlement.

From medieval times through to the early twentieth century the village was in effect a small collection of farms and farm workers' cottages.

Mainsforth Hall was a significant building in the centre of this small village, until its demolition in the 1960s. The hall was for many years the dwelling of the Surtees family. The most famous member of the family was Robert Surtees (1779–1834), a County Durham historian.

Today the hamlet contains several farms and older cottages and some modern executive-style detached dwellings. It retains its character principally because of the many trees in the village and because of the retention of the wall of Mainsforth Hall in the centre of the village.

Mainsforth Colliery, active from 1872-1968, lay between the village and Ferryhill Station.

References

Villages in County Durham
Bishop Middleham